The Battle of Balanjar was a battle in the Khazar–Arab Wars. In 722 or 723, according to Muhammad ibn Jarir al-Tabari, Umayyad soldiers under al-Jarrah ibn Abdallah crossed the Caucasus Mountains and attacked Balanjar. The inhabitants of Balanjar tried to defend their town by fastening 300 wagons together and circling them around the key fortress on high terrain, but were defeated in the attack. The Arabs massacred much of the town's population; survivors fled to other towns, including Samandar. The victorious Arab army stole much booty and the soldiers received large sums of money. After this battle, the Arabs went on to capture Samandar and the Muslims once again became a dominant force in Transcaucasia.

See also
Battle of Balanjar (disambiguation)

References

Sources 
 
 

Balanjar
Balanjar
Balanjar 723
Balanjar 723
723
720s in the Umayyad Caliphate
History of the North Caucasus